WCSN-FM (105.7 MHz, "Sunny 105.7 FM") is a radio station licensed to serve Orange Beach, Alabama, United States.  The station is owned by Gulf Coast Broadcasting Co., Inc. It airs a classic hits music format. It's transmitter is near Robertsdale, Alabama

The station was assigned the WCSN-FM call letters by the Federal Communications Commission on March 26, 2001.

References

External links
Sunny 105.7 Facebook

CSN-FM
Classic hits radio stations in the United States
Radio stations established in 1996